Mehmet Recai Kutan (born 1930) is a Turkish politician and the former leader of Felicity Party (SP).

Biography
Kutan graduated from ITU obtaining a degree in civil engineering in 1952. Until 1973, he worked as an engineer in various projects including the GAP. His political career started 1973 in MSP and after 1983 he served in Refah Party. He was minister of energy in 1996 in a coalition led by Refah Party.

At the 3rd party congress held on 26 October 2008 in Ankara, he did not run for his re-election as the leader of the SP, and was succeeded by Numan Kurtulmuş in the post. He is a member of the İsmailağa, a Turkish sufistic community of the Naqshbandi tariqah.

References

 Biography

External links

 

20th-century Turkish engineers
1930 births
Living people
People from Malatya
National Salvation Party politicians
Welfare Party politicians
Virtue Party politicians
Felicity Party politicians
Government ministers of Turkey
Leaders of political parties in Turkey
Istanbul Technical University alumni
Leaders of the Opposition (Turkey)
Deputies of Malatya
Ministers of Energy and Natural Resources of Turkey
Members of the 21st Parliament of Turkey
Members of the 20th Parliament of Turkey
Naqshbandi order
Turkish civil engineers